Peder Hvelplund (born 8 September 1967 in Ringkøbing) is a Danish politician, who is a member of the Folketing for the Red-Green Alliance political party. He was elected into parliament at the 2019 Danish general election.

Political career
Hvelplund ran in the 2015 Danish general election but was not elected, receiving 423 votes. While not elected, this made him the Red-Green Alliance's primary substitute for the North Jutland constituency. Stine Brix was elected for the party in the constituency, and Hvelplund acted as substitute for her on two occasions: from 22 December 2018 to 7 May 2019 and from 29 March 2016 to 28 February 2017.

Hvelplund was elected into parliament at the 2019 election, where he received 1,028	votes. During the COVID-19 pandemic the Red-Green Alliance made Hvelplund the spokesman of Corona-related issues.

External links 
 Biography on the website of the Danish Parliament (Folketinget)

References 

Living people
1967 births
People from Ringkøbing-Skjern Municipality
Red–Green Alliance (Denmark) politicians
Members of the Folketing 2019–2022
Members of the Folketing 2022–2026